Elachista achrantella is a moth of the family Elachistidae. It is found in North America in Saskatchewan and Colorado.

The length of the forewings is 4.2–5.7 mm. The costa in the basal sixth of the forewing is brownish grey, otherwise it is unicolorous silky while. The hindwings are translucent light grey and the underside of the wings is grey.

Etymology
The species name is an artificial combination of letters.

References

Moths described in 1997
achrantella
Moths of North America